Each year the Bill Evans Award is given to the person chosen as the best high school boys basketball player in the U.S. state of West Virginia.  The award winner is selected by members of the West Virginia Sports Writers Association. The award has been given annually since 1970.

Award winners

Most winners by college

Most winners by high school

References

Mr. and Miss Basketball awards
Basketball in West Virginia
Awards established in 1970
1970 establishments in West Virginia
Lists of people from West Virginia
West Virginia sports-related lists